Nahum Sonenberg,  (born December 29, 1946) is an Israeli Canadian microbiologist and biochemist. He is a James McGill professor of biochemistry at McGill University in Montreal, Quebec, Canada. He was an HHMI international research scholar from 1997 to 2011 and is now a senior international research scholar. He is best known for his seminal contributions to our understanding of translation, and notable for the discovery of the mRNA 5' cap-binding protein, eIF4E, the rate-limiting component of the eukaryotic translation apparatus.

Education
Sonenberg was born in a camp for displaced persons in Wetzlar, Germany and grew up in Israel. He received a B.Sc. and M.Sc. in Microbiology and Immunology from Tel-Aviv University and his Ph.D. in Biochemistry from the Weizmann Institute of Science in 1976. He later held a Chaim Weizmann postdoctoral fellowship at the Roche Institute of Molecular Biology. He joined McGill University in 1979.

Research
Sonenberg's primary research has been on the translational control of protein synthesis. Notably, he discovered the mRNA 5' cap-binding protein, eIF4E, the rate-limiting component of the eukaryotic translation apparatus, and also discovered the regulation of eIF4E by the eIF4EBPs. In addition, he has helped to decipher the roles of various other proteins involved in translation including the roles of other subunits of eIF4F (of which eIF4E is a member) including the helicase activity which scans mRNA to find the initiation codon. Sonenberg also discovered the Internal ribosome entry site (IRES) mode of translation, the cap-independent initiation of translation, which is critical for some mRNA involved in stress, cell cycling and apoptosis. His work in basic science has had an impact in the study of cancer, including the realization that eIF4E over expression is prominent in many cancers, and has suggested its utility as a tumor marker. Currently, he has expanded his research into topics such as the roles of translation in neurobiology and synaptic plasticity. Presently, his lab works on translational control in cancer, oncolytic viruses as anti-cancer drugs, microRNA control of translation, and translational control of plasticity, learning and memory. He received the Gairdner Foundation International Award in 2008 for his contributions to medical science. He was appointed an Officer of the Order of Canada in 2010.

In 2014, Sonenberg was awarded the Wolf Prize in Medicine.

Awards and recognition
Recipient of the Robert L. Noble Prize from the National Cancer Institute of Canada in 2002
Recipient of the Isaak-Walton-Killam Award for Health Sciences in 2005
Elected a Fellow of the Royal Society in 2006 
Recipient of the Gairdner Foundation International Award in 2008
Appointed as an Officer of the Order of Canada in 2010
Recipient of the Lewis S. Rosenstiel Award in 2011
Named Fellow of the American Association for the Advancement of Science in 2012
Recipient of the Royal Society of Canada McLaughlin Medal in 2013
Recipient of the Wolf Prize in 2014
Elected Foreign Associate, US National Academy of Sciences in 2015

References

External links
http://www.medicine.mcgill.ca/nahum/

1946 births
Living people
Israeli biochemists
Jewish Canadian scientists
Israeli Jews
Israeli emigrants to Canada
Israeli microbiologists
Academic staff of McGill University
Officers of the Order of Canada
Scientists from Montreal
Canadian Fellows of the Royal Society
Tel Aviv University alumni
Weizmann Institute of Science alumni
Wolf Prize in Medicine laureates
Fellows of the American Association for the Advancement of Science
Foreign associates of the National Academy of Sciences
Members of the National Academy of Medicine